Tarzan's Hidden Jungle is a 1955 black-and-white film from RKO Pictures directed by Harold D. Schuster and starring Gordon Scott in his first film as Tarzan, taking over the role from Lex Barker, who had in turn followed Johnny Weissmuller in the series. The film about Edgar Rice Burroughs' ape-man also features Vera Miles and Jack Elam. It was the last of twelve Tarzan pictures released by RKO.

Tarzan's mate, Jane, does not appear in the film. Tarzan at first seems to show more than casual interest in Miles' character Jill Hardy, but ultimately there is no romance. In real life, Scott and Miles were married after the film was completed.
Scott eventually played Tarzan in six movies over a five-year span.

Plot
Two hunters come into the jungle intent on killing as many animals as they can in order to get barrels of animal fat, lion skins and elephant tusks. Tarzan tries to help a baby elephant, one of their first victims. He takes the elephant to an animal doctor and his female assistant, who have pitched their tents in the jungle to do business. The hunters turn up and pretend they are photographers and have the doctor escort them to where the animals are. They leave the doctor and start killing animals. His assistant finds out what they're really up to and goes after them but needs Tarzan's help when she stumbles into quicksand. He rescues her, and she says she needs a bath so Tarzan throws her into the river.

They reach a tribe that worships animals and who are Tarzan's friends. However, the tribe hears that animals are being slaughtered and decide to kill the doctor and his assistant, who were responsible for leading the hunters there. Tarzan goes after the villains and they end up getting their just deserts. He arrives back in time to save the doctor and his assistant after they have been thrown into a pit of lions.

Cast
 Gordon Scott as Tarzan
 Vera Miles as Jill Hardy
 Peter van Eyck as Dr. Celliers
 Jack Elam as Burger
 Charles E. Fredericks as DeGroot
 Richard Reeves as Reeves
 Don Beddoe as Mr. Johnson
 Jester Hairston as Witch Doctor
 Rex Ingram as Sukulu Chieftain
 Ike Jones as Malenki
 Maidie Norman as Suma

See also
 List of American films of 1955

References

External links
 
 
 
 ERBzine Silver Screen: Tarzan's Hidden Jungle

1955 films
1950s fantasy adventure films
American black-and-white films
American fantasy adventure films
American sequel films
1950s English-language films
Films about hunters
Tarzan films
Films directed by Harold D. Schuster
Films produced by Sol Lesser
Films scored by Paul Sawtell
1950s American films